As of March 2016, the Belgium national team has been led by at least 89 different captains; 86 different players started an international game as captain, but due to substitutions the total number is higher. At least 15 pure forwards and eight goalkeepers have fulfilled this role but most often Red Devils in defensive positions and midfielders were assigned as captain, as is usually the case in association football. Until 2011 under Dick Advocaat and Georges Leekens the former Belgium U-23 captain Thomas Vermaelen was chosen as national squad's leader, but during an injury period he left the captaincy to Vincent Kompany, who became the new permanent captain. After several periods of injuries and missing out UEFA Euro 2016, Kompany gradually lost his position as captain to Eden Hazard by 2017.

All-time captain list

The following table shows which Belgian footballers started international games as captain, and during which period. Players that received the captain's armband because of a substitution or expulsion during a match are not counted.

Last updated: Brazil vs. Belgium, 6 July 2018. Statistics include official FIFA-recognised matches only.

Footnotes

References

captain
Belgium
Association football player non-biographical articles